Sophie Erre (born 6 April 1979) is a former professional tennis player from France.

Biography
A right-handed player from Calais, Erre had a best ranking in singles of 165 in the world.

Erre qualified for her first WTA Tour main draw at the 2000 Internationaux de Strasbourg, after which she was received a wildcard into the French Open, where she was beaten in the first round by Tamarine Tanasugarn in two tiebreaks.

ITF finals

Singles: 8 (5–3)

Doubles: 1 (0–1)

References

External links
 
 

1979 births
Living people
French female tennis players
Sportspeople from Calais